Eilema comorensis is a moth of the subfamily Arctiinae. It was described by Hervé de Toulgoët in 1955. It is found on the Comoros.

References

comorensis
Moths described in 1955
Moths of the Comoros
Endemic fauna of the Comoros